The 2019 Abia State House of Assembly election was held on March 9, 2019, to elect members of the Abia State House of Assembly in Nigeria. All the 24 seats were up for election in the Abia State House of Assembly. PDP won all the 24 available seats.

Upon the opening of the 7th State House of Assembly, Chinedum Orji (Umuahia Central) was elected as Speaker of the House while Ifeanyi Uchendu (PDP-Ohafia South) and Solomon Akpulonu (PDP-Obingwa East) became Deputy Speaker and House Leader, respectively.

Results

Aba Central
A total of 19 candidates registered with the Independent National Electoral Commission to contest in the election. APGA candidate Abraham Oba won the election, defeating PDP Sunday Maduako and 17 other party candidates. Oba got 6,268 votes, while his closest rival got 4,331.

Aba North
A total of 21 candidates registered with the Independent National Electoral Commission to contest in the election. PDP candidate Uzodike Aaron won the election, defeating APGA Nwagwu Araraka and 19 other party candidates.

Aba South
A total of 20 candidates registered with the Independent National Electoral Commission to contest in the election. APGA candidate Obinna Ichita Martin won the election, defeating PDP Clinton Ebere and 18 other party candidates.

Arochukwu 
A total of 18 candidates registered with the Independent National Electoral Commission to contest in the election. APGA candidate Onyekwere M.Ukoha won the election, defeating PDP Eric Kalu and 16 other party candidates.

Bende North 
A total of 15 candidates registered with the Independent National Electoral Commission to contest in the election. APC candidate Chukwu Chijioke won the election, defeating PDP Cosmos Ndukwe and 13 other party candidates.

Bende South 
A total of 18 candidates registered with the Independent National Electoral Commission to contest in the election. PDP candidate Emmanuel C. Ndubuisi won the election, defeating APC Chibuzor Okogbhua and 16 other party candidates.

Ikwuano 
A total of 18 candidates registered with the Independent National Electoral Commission to contest in the election. PDP candidate Stanley Nwabuisi won the election, defeating APC Nwaka Emma and 16 other party candidates.

Isiala Ngwa South 
A total of 12 candidates registered with the Independent National Electoral Commission to contest in the election. PDP candidate Chikwendu Kalu won the election, defeating APGA Levi Ebere and 10 other party candidates.

Isiala Ngwa North 
A total of 12 candidates registered with the Independent National Electoral Commission to contest in the election. PDP candidate Onwusibe Ginger won the election, defeating APC Anaba Ikechukwu and 10 other party candidates.

Isuikwuato 
A total of 16 candidates registered with the Independent National Electoral Commission to contest in the election. APC candidate Emeka Okoroafor won the election, defeating PDP Francis Eliezu and 10 other party candidates.

Obingwa East 
A total of 15 candidates registered with the Independent National Electoral Commission to contest in the election. PDP candidate Solomon Akpulonu won the election, defeating APC Alexander Nwaigwe and 13 other party candidates.

Obingwa West 
A total of 15 candidates registered with the Independent National Electoral Commission to contest in the election. PDP candidate Solomon Akpulonu won the election, defeating APC Alexander Nwaigwe and 13 other party candidates.

Ohafia North 
A total of 15 candidates registered with the Independent National Electoral Commission to contest in the election. PDP candidate Solomon Akpulonu won the election, defeating APC Alexander Nwaigwe and 13 other party candidates.

Ohafia South 
A total of 17 candidates registered with the Independent National Electoral Commission to contest in the election. PDP candidate Ifeanyi Uchendu won the election, defeating APGA Leonard Ema and 15 other party candidates.

Osisioma North 
A total of 15 candidates registered with the Independent National Electoral Commission to contest in the election. PDP candidate Kennedy Njoku won the election, defeating APGA Prince Ekpemo and 13 other party candidates.

Igbo Eze North II 
A total of 10 candidates registered with the Independent National Electoral Commission to contest in the election. PDP candidate Ugwu Innocent Emeka won the election, defeating APC Eze Joel Chukwudi and 8 other party candidates. Emeka received 96.1% of the votes, while Chukwudi received 3.5%.

Udenu 
A total of 12 candidates registered with the Independent National Electoral Commission to contest in the election. PDP candidate Ezeugwu Ikechukwu won the election, defeating APC Eze Jude Onyenechi and 10 other party candidates. Ikechukwu received  96.6% of the votes, while Onyenechi received 2.9%.

Oji River 
A total of 13 candidates registered with the Independent National Electoral Commission to contest in the election. PDP candidate Mbah Geoffrey won the election, defeating APC Onyebuchi Michel and 11 other party candidates. Geoffrey received 94.1% of the votes, while Michel received 4.8%.

Nsukka West 
A total of 8 candidates registered with the Independent National Electoral Commission to contest in the election. PDP candidate Ugwuwerua Emma won the election, defeating APC Ugwuja George and 6 other party candidates. Emma received 96.4% of the votes, while George received 3%.

Nsukka East 
A total of 13 candidates registered with the Independent National Electoral Commission to contest in the election. PDP candidate Nwamba Christian won the election, defeating APC Omeje Ikpechukwu Evans and 11 other party candidates. Christian received 92.4% of the votes, while Evans received 4.7%.

Nkanu West 
A total of 17 candidates registered with the Independent National Electoral Commission to contest in the election. PDP candidate Aniagu Iloabuchi D. won the election, defeating APC Richard Ngene C. and 15 other party candidates. Iloabuchi received 97.3% of the votes, while Ngene received 1.6%.

Uzo Uwani 
A total of 11 candidates registered with the Independent National Electoral Commission to contest in the election. PDP candidate Okika Josephat E. won the election, defeating APC Ugwuoke Blessing C. and 9 other party candidates. Josephat received 97.8% of the votes, while Blessing received 1.4%.

Udi South 
A total of 15 candidates registered with the Independent National Electoral Commission to contest in the election. PDP candidate Eneh Chukwuka won the election, defeating APC Edozie Chukwuedozie Confidence and 13 other party candidates. Chukwuka received 90% of the votes, while Confidence received 3.6%.

Udi North 
A total of 16 candidates registered with the Independent National Electoral Commission to contest in the election. PDP candidate Ugwu Uche won the election, defeating APC Ozongwu Magnus Okwu and 14 other party candidates. Uche received 86.4% of the votes, while Okwu received 6.4%.

References 

Abia State House of Assembly elections
House of Assembly
Abia State
March 2019 events in Nigeria